Dendrobium hookerianum is a species of  orchid, native to Asia, in the genus Dendrobium.

Distribution
The plant is native to the eastern Himalayas region.

It is found in Tibet, Bhutan, Bangladesh, Myanmar, Nepal, northeastern India in Arunachal Pradesh and Assam, and China in Yunnan.

References

hookerianum
Orchids of Assam
Orchids of Yunnan
Flora of East Himalaya
Flora of Indo-China
Flora of Arunachal Pradesh
Plants described in 1859